Conraua, known as slippery frogs or giant frogs is a genus of large frogs from sub-Saharan Africa. Conraua is the only genus in the family Conrauidae. Alternatively, it may be placed in the family Petropedetidae.

Four of the seven species in this genus are threatened.

Etymology
The generic name Conraua honours Gustav Conrau, a German trader and labour recruiter in Cameroon who was the collector of the holotype of Conraua robusta, the type species of the genus.

Species
The recognized species are:
Conraua alleni 
Conraua beccarii 
Conraua crassipes 
Conraua derooi Hulselmans, 1972
Conraua goliath (Boulenger, 1906) – goliath frog
Conraua robusta Nieden, 1908 – Cameroon slippery frog
Conraua sagyimase Neira-Salamea, Ofori-Boateng, Kouamé, Blackburn, Segniagbeto, Hillers, Barej, Leaché & Rödel, 2021

Nota bene: A binomial authority in parentheses indicates that the species was originally described in a genus other than Conraua.

References

External links

 
Amphibians of Sub-Saharan Africa
Amphibian genera
Taxa named by Fritz Nieden